Reprinka is a rural locality in Soldatsky Selsoviet Rural Settlement, Fatezhsky District, Kursk Oblast, Russia. The population as of 2010 is 9.

Geography 
The village is located on the Ruda River (a link tributary of the Usozha in the basin of the Svapa) and its tributary, Zhuravchik, 94 km from the Russia–Ukraine border, 44 km north-west of Kursk, 11 km south-west of the district center – the town Fatezh, 6.5 km from the selsoviet center – Soldatskoye.

Climate
Reprinka has a warm-summer humid continental climate (Dfb in the Köppen climate classification).

Transport 
Reprinka is located 9 km from the federal route  Crimea Highway as part of the European route E105, 9 km from the road of regional importance  (Fatezh – Dmitriyev), 2 km from the road of intermunicipal significance  (38K-038 – Soldatskoye – Shuklino), 31.5 km from the nearest railway halt 29 km (railway line Arbuzovo – Luzhki-Orlovskiye).

The rural locality is situated 48 km from Kursk Vostochny Airport, 162 km from Belgorod International Airport and 241 km from Voronezh Peter the Great Airport.

References

Notes

Sources

Rural localities in Fatezhsky District